Club Atlético Anglo is a football club from Fray Bentos in Uruguay.

Established on June 1, 1907 with the denomination Liebig Football Club, changed later.

On June 13, 1912, together with the Fray Bentos F.C. was established the Liga Departamental de Fútbol de Río Negro.

The "Anglo" is notable for its secular rivalry with the Laureles F.C.

References

External links
 First Division
 Parque Anglo

Football clubs in Uruguay
Association football clubs established in 1907
1907 establishments in Uruguay
Fray Bentos
Sport in Río Negro Department